Stanley Weiss is an American professional poker player residing in Nashville, Tennessee.

In May 2006, Weiss won the World Poker Tour (WPT) fifth season Mirage Poker Showdown and earned $1,084,037. On the final hand he held K♠ 5♦ and outdrew Harry Demetriou's K♥ 6♣ on the river. Weiss had also won a preliminary event at the Mirage Poker Showdown before his WPT victory.

As of 2008, Weiss's total live tournament winnings exceed $1,450,000.

Notes

External links
Stan Weiss takes the World Poker Tour Mirage Poker Showdown

American poker players
World Poker Tour winners
Living people
Year of birth missing (living people)